The Grigorovich IP-1 (for Истребитель Пушечный - "Cannon fighter") was a fighter aircraft produced in the Soviet Union in the 1930s. When the performance of both the Grigorovich I-Z and its single-shot Kurchevski DRP cannon armament proved disappointing, the development of that particular system did not halt development of the basic underlying concept of a cannon-armed bomber destroyer. Leonid Kurchevsky developed a new, 75 mm cannon designated the Kurchevski APK-4 which could fire five shots instead of just one, and once again the Grigorovich design bureau created an aircraft to carry it. The IP-1 was a conventional, low-wing cantilever monoplane with retractable tailskid undercarriage and an open cockpit. Construction throughout was all-metal, and like its predecessor, its horizontal stabiliser was mounted high to avoid gasses from the underwing cannons. Once again, however, trials proved the concept a failure.

Nevertheless, the IP-1 was ordered into production, with a modified version that dispensed with the cannon and instead carried a 20 mm autocannon and three 7.62 mm machine guns in and under each wing. Some 90 of these were supplied to the Soviet Air Force in 1936 and 1937, but were outclassed and overshadowed by the Polikarpov I-16.

A final development was the IP-4 prototype, which was armed with four 45 mm Kurchevski APK-11 cannon, but this was no more successful than any of the other Kurchevski-armed types, and a second prototype was abandoned before it was completed.

Operators

Soviet Air Force

Specifications (IP-1)

References

 
 

1930s Soviet fighter aircraft
Grigorovich aircraft
Single-engined tractor aircraft
Low-wing aircraft
Aircraft first flown in 1935